Warm Summer Rain is a 1989 drama film written and directed by Joe Gayton, starring Kelly Lynch and Barry Tubb.

Synopsis
Kate is a depressed thirty-something who unsuccessfully attempts suicide by slitting her wrists. Reflecting briefly upon her circumstance in the hospital, she realizes that nothing has been solved, whereupon she vacates the premises, wearing nothing but a hospital gown, a black coat, and flimsy sandals.  Shortly thereafter, at a bus station, she requests from the attendant a bus ticket to wherever, with consideration to the limited funds she has to spare. The attendant insists on a destination, or even a direction – Kate spins about, points, and says, "that way".

She then gets off the bus in the middle of nowhere, and after turning down a ride from a handsome stranger in a Mustang convertible, she walks though the desert and finds an isolated bar.  Getting drunk at the bar, she parties with some people in the bar.  The stranger who tried picking her up along the road comes in and eventually she passes out.   She wakes up the next morning in an abandoned house, with the stranger, wearing a ring.  He tells her that they were married in the bar and shows her some Polaroid photos of the "ceremony".

Hiding out in an abandoned house in the desert, the pair embarks on a torrid journey of sensual and romantic discovery, that rekindles her will to live, but it soon becomes clear that things can't stay this way forever.

Cast
 Kelly Lynch as Kate
 Barry Tubb as Handsome Stranger
 Ron Sloan as Andy
 Larry Poindexter as Steve

Production notes
 The film contains much nudity, graphic sexual scenes, and extremely profane language.
 Feature directorial debut for Joe Gayton.
 Began shooting 12 September 1988; completed 1 March 1989, released theatrically in April 1989
 The film was theatrically released in a widescreen format, however the DVD released by MGM is cropped to the 4:3 Pan/Scan format.

External links

1989 films
1989 drama films
1980s drama road movies
American drama road movies
Films directed by Joe Gayton
1980s American films